Henry Keating may refer to:
Henry Sheehy Keating (1775–1847), British officer
Henry Singer Keating (1804–1888), British lawyer and politician
Edward Henry Keating (1844-1912), Canadian engineer who proposed the creation of Keating channel
John Keating (Australian politician) (John Henry Keating, 1872–1940)
Henry Crozier Keating Plummer (1875–1946), British astronomer
H. R. F. Keating (1926–2011), British crime fiction writer